"Miami Twice" is the two-part tenth Christmas special edition of the British sitcom Only Fools and Horses. The first episode, on-screen subtitle "The American Dream", was first screened on 24 December 1991. The second episode of "Miami Twice" was first screened the following day, 25 December 1991. The second episode is subtitled "Oh to Be in England".

When "Oh To Be in England" was originally broadcast on Christmas Day it ran at 95 minutes. Subsequent repeats on BBC One often edited this to 85 minutes. Material removed in the shorter version included sections of dialogue in the introduction where Del and Rodney discuss how the trip was paid for and that "there will be no women on this trip," as well as two scenes back in Peckham, in the flat with Albert and Raquel, and in the Nag's Head when Del appears on the Six O'Clock News.

On the 1998 VHS release (and subsequent DVD release), it was reedited as one episode, and titled "Miami Twice: The Movie". This contains a number of edits from the original. The final scene of Del and Rodney in the departure lounge in "The American Dream" which segues in the end credits was removed, alongside part of the scene in the bar during "Oh To Be in England". The usual musical replacements were also made in some scenes. Notably in this version a laugh track is added to "Oh To Be In England".

The episodes are available separately on iTunes, Amazon Prime and Netflix with the original broadcast music and no laughter track on "Oh To Be In England". However, the shorter 85-minute version of "Oh To Be in England" is the version used on these sites.

David Jason chose the second episode as his favourite episode of Only Fools and Horses in 2015, recalling its background on a special pre-recorded clip that was broadcast before a repeat of the episode on Gold as a forerunner for the Only Fools and Horses Top 20 series.

Synopsis

Miami Twice – Part One: The American Dream
The episode opens with Damien's christening, shortly after which Del Boy concludes a deal with the vicar to sell "pre-blessed" communion wine from Romania. The vicar will bless lorry loads of wine, which will then be sold to churches all over the UK. Meanwhile, Rodney is beginning to reconcile with Cassandra, staying with her on weekends, and has learned from Alan that having resigned from his job with Parry Print Ltd in "The Chance of a Lunchtime", Rodney can now claim his pension money.

A few days later, at Sid's cafe, Del tells Rodney about how he can get him and Cassandra back together instantly: a holiday to Miami, for which Del has already bought tickets – with Rodney's pension money. Del's "pre-blessed" wine deal also falls through; the wine he intends to use turns out to be Romanian Riesling, which is white and unsuitable for communion.

An irate Rodney returns home later that night, having learned that Cassandra has important meetings with her bosses at the bank that week and thus cannot go with him. Despite Rodney's initial nervousness to the idea, Del persuades his brother to let him go with him instead. The episode ends as the Trotter Brothers board their Virgin Atlantic Boeing 747 plane to America (satirically encountering Richard Branson).

Miami Twice – Part Two: Oh to Be in England
With Del Boy and Rodney having arranged a holiday to Miami, this one takes place predominantly in that location. It emerges that boss of a local mafia family, a Don Vito Corleone parody named Don Vincenzo "Vinny the Chain" Ochetti, is on trial and facing life imprisonment for murder, kidnapping and drug trafficking. Ochetti is also a doppelgänger for Del Boy (and is thus also played by David Jason). When his son Rico is with members of the family in a bar, they notice Del. Befriending him and Rodney, they hatch a plot to assassinate Del with the intention of tricking the public into thinking that the Don himself has been murdered, thus sparing him the trial and certain imprisonment.

After arranging for their camper van to be robbed, the group invite Del and Rodney to stay at the family mansion. Over the following days, several attempts to kill Del, including shooting him in a beach-side restaurant and sending him off on a jet ski with a broken throttle, fail.

Meanwhile, Rodney contacts Cassandra and learns that Del knew Cassandra would be unable to go on holiday that particular week and therefore booked it to guarantee himself a free holiday with Rodney's pension money. An enraged Rodney encounters Ochetti and believing him to be Del pins him up against the wall and promises revenge. However just after the confused Don leaves, Rodney meets Del, who admits to Rodney that he wanted to lay low for a while to avoid repercussions from the Church for selling them the white wine. Rodney however is unable to understand how Del got back into their room as Rodney got there first and locked the door whilst Del is also wearing different clothes. Rodney begins to think there is someone in the mansion who looks like Del.

Whilst browsing around the family mansion, Del discovers who Rico's family really are after inadvertently being left in a meeting with two Colombian drug barons by Rico, who mistook Del for his father. After the meeting he also informs Rodney of Rico and the family's true intentions. Realising he has just attacked the head of a mafia family, Rodney agrees to return home and the two brothers escape through the window and run, ultimately ending up in the Everglades, dodging the gangsters and an alligator where they meet the holidaying Boycie and Marlene. Despite being cornered by the gangsters, they manage to escape.

After pinning the drug dealing papers on the park ranger station's door, the Trotter brothers go straight to the airport and wait there until their return flight to England, where it is revealed on a news programme that Ochetti had been found guilty on all counts, and Rico was arrested for illegally hunting in the Everglades. Upon returning home, Del Boy and Rodney find stacked boxes of white wine in their flat, as well as a welcoming Raquel and Albert.

Episode cast

Part One
In order of appearance
David Jason as Derek Trotter
Nicholas Lyndhurst as Rodney Trotter
Buster Merryfield as Albert Trotter
Tessa Peake-Jones as Raquel Turner
Gwyneth Strong as Cassandra Trotter
John Challis as Boycie
Roger Lloyd-Pack as Trigger
Kenneth MacDonald as Mike Fisher
Sue Holderness as Marlene
Denis Lill as Alan Parry
Wanda Ventham as Pamela Parry
Patrick Murray as Mickey Pearce
Paul Barber as Denzil Tulser
Roy Heather as Sid
Treva Etienne as the Vicar
Grant Stevens as Damien Trotter (uncredited)
Richard Branson as himself (uncredited)

Part Two
David Jason as Derek Trotter/Don Vincenzo Occhetti
Nicholas Lyndhurst as Rodney Trotter
Buster Merryfield as Albert Trotter
Tessa Peake-Jones as Raquel Turner
Gwyneth Strong as Cassandra Trotter
John Challis as Boycie
Roger Lloyd-Pack as Trigger
Kenneth MacDonald as Mike Fisher
Sue Holderness as Marlene
Paul Barber as Denzil Tulser
Patrick Murray as Mickey Pearce
Denis Lill as Alan Parry
Roy Heather as Sid
Treva Etienne as the Vicar
Grant Stevens as Damien Trotter
Antoni Corone as Ricardo 'Rico' Occhetti
Tom Kouchalakos as Salvatore
Raphael Gomez as Pauly
Dave Corey as Lurch
Jay Amor as Tony
Mario Ernesto Sánchez as Alberto Vasquez
Roberto Escobar as Francesco
Roger Pretto as Carlotti
Alfredo Álvarez Calderón as Herrena
John Archie as Cop
Rob Fuller as Cop
Dee Dee Deering as Miss Daisy
Jeff Gillen as Man in Restroom
Renee Sweeney as News Reporter
Will Knickerbocker as Mac
D.L. Blakely as Everglades ranger
Damien Chuck as Camera Thief
Joshua Rosen as Tyler Boyce
Jackie Davis as Taxi Driver
Barry Gibb as himself
Nick Scott as the Man on the Aeroplane

Notes 

 The title of the two-part special is derived from the 1984 American television series Miami Vice.

Anomalies
The second part of "Miami Twice" is something of an anomaly in the series. There was incidental music throughout the episode, which was not normally used in the series. It was one of only two episodes to be shot entirely on film (the other being "To Hull and Back" although, unlike that episode, the set of The Nag's Head and the Trotters' flat did not have an extra wall), only three without a laugh track (the others being "To Hull and Back" and "A Royal Flush"), one of three not to use the regular closing music (the others being "The Jolly Boys' Outing" and "Rodney Come Home") and the only episode not to use the regular opening titles and theme music, instead opting for a cover of The Lovin' Spoonful song Summer in the City, recorded by the Gutter Brothers. The only on-screen mention of "Only Fools and Horses" in this episode appeared on the first caption of the closing credits, whereas only the name "Miami Twice" appeared in the opening titles. The second episode's title "Oh To Be in England" did not appear on screen, but was confirmed by Steve Clark. However, the first episode "The American Dream" used the regular opening titles and end theme, and was also produced like a regular episode – with a studio audience and on videotape.

Music

Miami Twice – Part 1: The American Dream
 Carl Orff: "O Fortuna" from Carmina Burana
 Amy Grant: "Every Heartbeat"
 Jive Bunny and the Mastermixers: "Hot Summer Salsa"
 Sting: "Englishman in New York"
 Billy Idol: "White Wedding"
 Midge Ure: "Cold Cold Heart"
 Simple Minds: "Let There Be Love"
 Tears for Fears: "Everybody Wants to Rule the World"

Miami Twice – Part 2: Oh To Be in England
 Status Quo: "Rockin' All Over the World"
 The Gutter Brothers: "Summer in the City"
 Amy Grant: "Baby Baby"
 The Shamen: "Hyperreal"
 Seal: "Killer"
 Paula Abdul: "Rush Rush"
 Julian Lennon: "Saltwater"
 Vic Reeves: "Born Free"

Note: In the VHS/DVD versions, Status Quo's "Rockin' All Over The World" is replaced by Tears For Fears' "Everybody Wants To Rule The World".  Carl Orff's "O Fortuna" is replaced by a similar-sounding piece of music.  In part 2, Amy Grant's "Baby Baby" is replaced with "Opposites Attract" by Paula Abdul.

During Part 2, Del Boy also sights Barry Gibb on a boat trip and sings "How Deep Is Your Love".

References

External links
The American Dream at BBC Online

Oh to Be in England at BBC Online

1991 British television episodes
British Christmas television episodes
Only Fools and Horses special episodes